Smashes and Trashes is a greatest hits album by the British rock band Skunk Anansie. It is a 15-track career-embracing album and includes three previously unreleased tracks; "Tear the Place Up", "Because of You" and "Squander". The bonus track edition includes acoustic versions of "Weak" and "Because of You". This is the band's first new material since splitting in 2001. The album was released surrounding a greatest hits tour around Europe.

On 3 July 2009, the music video for "Tear the Place Up" was posted on My Space. On 10 August 2009 a new video and song, "Because of You", was presented exclusively on Kerrang.com. It was released on 14 September 2009 in the UK, with "Squander" following on 9 November 2009. In 2010. It was awarded a silver certification from the Independent Music Companies Association which indicated sales of at least 30,000 copies throughout Europe.

In Italy the album was certified Gold by the Federation of the Italian Music Industry for sales in excess of 30,000 copies.

Track listing

References

2009 greatest hits albums
Skunk Anansie albums
One Little Independent Records compilation albums